The 161st New York State Legislature, consisting of the New York State Senate and the New York State Assembly, met from January 5 to March 19, 1938, during the sixth year of Herbert H. Lehman's governorship, in Albany.

Background
Under the provisions of the New York Constitution of 1894, re-apportioned in 1917, 51 Senators and 150 assemblymen were elected in single-seat districts; senators for a two-year term, assemblymen for a one-year term. The senatorial districts consisted either of one or more entire counties; or a contiguous area within a single county. The counties which were divided into more than one senatorial district were New York (nine districts), Kings (eight), Bronx (three), Erie (three), Monroe (two), Queens (two) and Westchester (two). The Assembly districts were made up of contiguous area, all within the same county.

At this time there were two major political parties: the Democratic Party and the Republican Party. The American Labor Party and the Socialist Party also nominated tickets. In New York City, a "Trades Union", an "Anti-Communist", and a "City Fusion" ticket were also nominated.

Elections
The New York state election, 1937, was held on November 2. The only statewide elective office up for election was a judgeship on the New York Court of Appeals. The Democratic incumbent, Gov. Herbert H. Lehman's brother Irving Lehman, was re-elected with Republican and American Labor endorsement.

At the same time, an amendment to the State Constitution to increase of the term in office of the members of the New York State Assembly to two years, and of the statewide elected state officers (Governor, Lieutenant Governor, Comptroller, Attorney General) to four years, was accepted. Also, delegates for a Constitutional Convention, to be held later that year after the legislative session, were elected.

Assemblywoman Jane H. Todd (Rep.), of Tarrytown, was re-elected.

Sessions
The Legislature met for the regular session at the State Capitol in Albany on January 5, 1938; and adjourned in the evening of March 19.

Oswald D. Heck (Rep.) was re-elected Speaker, with 83 votes against 55 for Irwin Steingut (Dem.) and 4 for Nathaniel M. Minkoff (Am. Labor).

The Constitutional Convention met at the State Capitol in Albany on April 5; and adjourned on August 26.

State Senate

Districts

Members
The asterisk (*) denotes members of the previous Legislature who continued in office as members of this Legislature.

Note: For brevity, the chairmanships omit the words "...the Committee on (the)..."

Employees
 Clerk: James J. Reilly
 Sergeant-at-Arms: William F. Egloff Jr.
 Stenographer: Robert Murray

State Assembly

Assemblymen

Note: For brevity, the chairmanships omit the words "...the Committee on (the)..."

Employees
 Clerk: Ansley B. Borkowski

Notes

Sources
 Members of Assembly—1938 in The State Employee (December 1937, Vol. 6, No. 9, pg. 16ff)
 Members of the New York Senate (1930s) at Political Graveyard
 Members of the New York Assembly (1930s) at Political Graveyard
 RULES GROUP OF ASSEMBLY ADDS MEMBER in the Rochester Democrat and Chronicle, of Rochester, on January 11, 1938

161
1938 in New York (state)
New York